The Miami 48-Hour Film Project is an annual short film contest held in Miami, Florida, and has been running since 2005. It is the Miami Chapter of the parent 48 Hour Film Project, which holds annual contests in over 96 cities worldwide.

Categories
Each team receives 4 elements to be included in the film: (1) a character, (2) a prop, (3) a line of dialogue and (4) a genre. These are selected at randomn at the start of the clock and are unique to each group. The final film must be produced and submitted within 48 hours.

List of genres

Comedy
Dark Comedy
Detective/Cop
Drama
Fantasy
Film de Femme
Horror
Mockumentary
Musical or Western
Romance
Sci Fi
Silent Film
Thriller/Suspense
Vacation or Holiday Film

List of awards

Best Film
Best Directing
Best Cinematography
Best Writing
Best Editing
Best Use of Character
Best Use of Prop
Best Use of Line
Best Ensemble Acting
Best Choreography
Best Costumes
Best Graphics
Best Music Score
Best Sound Design
Best Special Effects

Awards
Of the multiple categoric awards, one film is selected for overall "Best Film" and submitted to a jury for consideration against other City Winners for the competition year. The jury's selection from among these films is named the year's winner and is honored at Filmapalooza, the finale festival for the 48 Hour Film Project.

List of Best Film
2012 TBD
2011: "77" by Electroscope
2010: "Palindrome" by DC Dogs
2009: “Riddle of the Red Man-Eater” by Timestitch
2008: "Odie & Troy: A Film Maker's Odyssey" by Round Two Productions
2007: "A Monkton Family Christmas" by N Pictures
2006: "Maten al Payaso" by Team The Afafas
2005: "Trivial Things That People Say in Normal Letters" by CCEF

References

External links
 

Short film festivals in the United States
Film festivals in Florida